Governor Hammond may refer to:

Abram A. Hammond (1814–1874), 13th Lieutenant Governor of Indiana
James Henry Hammond (1807–1864), 60th Governor of South Carolina
Jay Hammond (1922–2005), 5th Governor of Alaska
Winfield Scott Hammond (1863–1915), 18th Governor of Minnesota